Katharina Binz (born ) is a German politician of Alliance 90/The Greens who has been serving as Minister for Family, Women, Culture and Integration in the third Cabinet of Minister-President Malu Dreyer  since 2021. She has also been a part of the German Bundesrat for Rhineland-Palatinate since 2021. In December 2021 she succeeded Anne Spiegel as Deputy Minister-President of Rhineland-Palatinate.

Early life and education 
Binz grew up in Mesenich and Moritzheim (Hunsrück). She graduated from high school in 2003 and moved to Mainz, where she studied political science, history and philosophy at the Johannes Gutenberg University. In the 2005-2006 election period, she was chairperson of the AStA at Mainz University. She then moved from the level of local student politics to the national level and was a board member of the national student association "freier zusammenschluss von student*innenschaften". The AStA of the University of Mainz was able to win her back as a speaker for political education in 2009.

Political career
Since 2007, Binz has been a member of the district executive of Bündnis 90/Die Grünen Mainz. She became active in local politics in the 2009 local elections in Rhineland-Palatinate, in which she won a seat on the Mainz city council. She was also elected as a successor for one of three seats for the Greens on the local council of the Hartenberg-Münchfeld district, and took up the mandate on 8 August 2011. She left this body on 30 November 2013 due to a move to Mainz-Finthen.

From 20 April 2013 to 20 May 2017, Binz was state chairwoman of Bündnis 90/Die Grünen Rhineland-Palatinate. On 1 April 2017, she succeeded Eveline Lemke in the State Parliament of Rhineland-Palatinate and resigned as state chairwoman on 20 May 2017.

Binz stood for the Greens in the Mainz I constituency for the 2021 Rhineland-Palatinate state election and won the first direct mandate for the Greens in the Rhineland-Palatinate state parliament here with 29.6 per cent of the primary vote. On 18 May 2021, she was appointed Minister for Family, Women, Culture and Integration in the Cabinet Dreyer III. In the course of this, she resigned her state parliament mandate. Daniel Köbler succeeded her in the Landtag. 

Binz was nominated by her party as delegate to the Federal Convention for the purpose of electing the President of Germany in 2022.

Other activities 
 Cultural Foundation of the German States (KdL), Ex-Officio Member of the Council (since 2021)

References 

1983 births
Living people
Alliance 90/The Greens politicians
People from Zell (Mosel)
21st-century German women politicians
Johannes Gutenberg University Mainz alumni